Mandarin's Gold is a lost 1919 silent film drama directed by Oscar Apfel and starring Kitty Gordon.

Cast
Kitty Gordon - Betty Cardon
Irving Cummings - Blair Cardon
George MacQuarrie - Geoffrey North
Marguerite Gale - Susan Pettigrew
Veronica Lee - Cherry Blossom
Warner Oland - Li Hsun
Joseph Lee - Wu Sing
Marion Barney - Mrs. Stone
Tony Merlo - Bertie Standish
Charles Fang - ?
Alice Lee - ?

References

External links
 Mandarin's Gold at IMDb.com

1919 films
American silent feature films
Lost American films
Films directed by Oscar Apfel
World Film Company films
American black-and-white films
Silent American drama films
1919 drama films
1919 lost films
Lost drama films
1910s American films